The Lazarev Mountains are a chain of mountains in Antarctica. The mountains were photographed from the air by U.S. Navy Operation Highjump (1946–1947), the Soviet Antarctic Expedition (1957–1958) and an Australian National Antarctic Research Expedition (1959). They were named by the Soviet expedition after Lieutenant Mikhail Petrovich Lazarev, commander of the sloop Mirnyy of the Bellingshausen expedition (1819–1821).

References

Mountain ranges of Oates Land